The Little Brother is a 1917 American silent drama directed by Charles Miller and starring William Garwood and Australian actress Enid Bennett. The scenario was written by Lambert Hillyer based on a story by Lois Zellner.

Cast
Enid Bennett as Jerry Ross
William Garwood as Franak Girard
Josephine Headley as Janet Girard
Dorcas Matthews as Dulcie Hayes
William Fairbanks as Dillon (as Carl Ullman)

External links

1917 drama films
1917 films
Silent American drama films
American silent feature films
American black-and-white films
Triangle Film Corporation films
Films directed by Charles Miller
1910s American films